Third-degree relatives are a segment of the extended family and includes first cousins, great grandparents and great grandchildren. Third-degree relatives are generally defined by the expected amount of genetic overlap that exists between two people, with the third-degree relatives of an individual sharing approximately 12.5% of their genes. The category includes great-grandparents, great-grandchildren, grand-uncles,  grand-aunts, first cousins, half-uncles, half-aunts, half-nieces and half-nephews.

See also
Family
First-degree relative
Second-degree relative

References

Family